Çataltepe (literally "fork hill") is a Turkish place name that may refer to the following places in Turkey:

 Çataltepe, Gölbaşı, a village in the district of Gölbaşı, Adıyaman Province
 Çataltepe, Kahta, a village in the district of Kahta, Adıyaman Province
 Çataltepe, Kestel
 Çataltepe, Lapseki
 Çataltepe, Manyas, a village